Yi He is a romanization of various Chinese words and names.

It may refer to:

 Yi River (沂河) in Shandong, China
 Yick Wo, the plaintiff in the US court case Yick Wo v. Hopkins